An election was held on 22 January 2013 for the post of Governor of the Indonesian province of South Sulawesi. The incumbent governor Syahrul Yasin Limpo of the Golkar party was re-elected with 52% of the vote. The principal opponent was Ilham Arief Sirajuddin of the Democratic Party, who obtained 42% of the vote.

2013 Indonesian gubernatorial elections
Elections in South Sulawesi
Politics of Indonesia